Halide is a computer programming language designed for writing digital image processing code that takes advantage of memory locality, vectorized computation and multi-core CPUs and GPUs. Halide is implemented as an internal domain-specific language (DSL) in C++.

Language
The main innovation Halide brings is the separation of the algorithm being implemented from its execution schedule, i.e. code specifying the loop nesting, parallelization, loop unrolling and vector instruction. These two are usually interleaved together and experimenting with changing the schedule requires the programmer to rewrite large portions of the algorithm with every change. With Halide, changing the schedule does not require any changes to the algorithm and this allows the programmer to experiment with scheduling and finding the most efficient one.

Sample source code 
The following function defines and sets the schedule for a 3×3 box filter defined as a series of two 3×1 passes:
Func blur_3x3(Func input) {
  Func blur_x, blur_y;
  Var x, y, xi, yi;

  // The algorithm - no storage or order
  blur_x(x, y) = (input(x-1, y) + input(x, y) + input(x+1, y))/3;
  blur_y(x, y) = (blur_x(x, y-1) + blur_x(x, y) + blur_x(x, y+1))/3;

  // The schedule - defines order, locality; implies storage
  blur_y.tile(x, y, xi, yi, 256, 32)
        .vectorize(xi, 8).parallel(y);
  blur_x.compute_at(blur_y, x).vectorize(x, 8);

  return blur_y;
}

Use
Google used Halide and TensorFlow for its Pixel 2 Pixel Visual Core. Adobe Photoshop also uses Halide. Both Google and Adobe have been involved in Halide research.

See also 
 Cuneiform (programming language)
 Algorithmic skeleton
 Parallel programming model

References

External links 
 http://halide-lang.org/
 Decoupling Algorithms from Schedules for Easy Optimization of Image Processing Pipelines
  

Image processing
Functional languages
Parallel computing